Inside Space is an hour long science and technology program produced by the Sci Fi Channel. Its topics ranged from space exploration and technology to personal technologies. The series went on the air in 1994 and Geoff Fox hosted four seasons. Inside Space was part of the Cable in the Classroom initiative and thus aired in reruns until 1999.

1990s American documentary television series
1994 American television series debuts
1998 American television series endings